Pupunahue is a coal mine and hamlet in Los Ríos Region near the towns of Máfil and Los Lagos. The coal beds exploited in Pupunahue belong to the Pupunahue Beds. Geologically the sedimentary rocks of the Pupunahue Beds containing coal lie in Pupunahue Basin, a sub-basin of the larger Pupunahue-Mulpún Neogene Carboniferous Basin. The coals of Pupunahue deposited during the Oligo-Miocene in an environment with moderate marine influence and certainly less marine influence than for the nearby Catamutún coals. In 2016 it was announced that the closed Pupunahue mine would become a national heritage site.

See also

The Jackal of Pupunahue
Coal mining in Chile
History of mining in Chile

Notes

References

Coal mines in Chile
Geography of Los Ríos Region
Mines in Los Ríos Region
Populated places in Valdivia Province
Underground mines in Chile
Former mines in Chile